The Great Synagogue of London was, for centuries, the centre of Ashkenazi synagogue and Jewish life in London. Built north of Aldgate in the 17th century, it was destroyed during World War II, in the Blitz.

History
The earliest Ashkenazi synagogue constructed in London, after the return of Jews to England in the 17th century, was built about 1690 at Duke's Place, north of Aldgate, in the City of London. In 1696–7, the synagogue also acquired a burial ground, at Alderney Road.

The congregation grew, and in 1722 a new building was erected with the cost of £2,000 being borne by businessman and philanthropist Moses Hart. The building was consecrated on Rosh Hashana (September 18, 1722). An enlarged building, designed by George Dance the Elder, was consecrated on August 29, 1766. The order of prayers for the inauguration was the first printed publication of the synagogue, and also the first publication to name it explicitly as 'The Great Synagogue'.

Between 1788 and 1790, the third synagogue was built on the site. Unusually for the time, the principal donor was a woman, Judith Levy, a daughter of Moses Hart, who subscribed £4,000. The architect was James Spiller. The building was in the classical style identified with John Adam. It was redecorated and repaired in 1832 and 1852 by John Walen, and restored again with small renovations in 1899 and 1930.

The Royal Dukes of Cambridge, Cumberland, and Sussex, sons of George III, visited the Great Synagogue of London in 1809. There they were seated on elegant Egyptian revival chairs as they watched the religious service. The synagogue was also visited around this period, during his schooldays, by the writer Leigh Hunt, who wrote 'I took pleasure in witnessing the semi-Catholic pomp of their service and in hearing their fine singing, not without something of a constant astonishment at their wearing their hats'.

The synagogue was destroyed during the night of May 10/11, 1941, during one of the last major attacks of the Blitz. A plaque commemorating the synagogue is placed on Duke's Place.

Rabbis

The rabbis of the Great Synagogue, and their terms of office, included:
 Judah Loeb Cohen, 1696–1700
 Aaron the Scribe of Dublin (acting rabbi) (1700-c. 1704)
Aaron Hart, c. 1704–1756
Hart Lyon, 1758–1764
David Tevele Schiff, 1765–1792
 Moses Myers (acting rabbi) 1792–1802
Solomon Hirschell, 1802–1842
Nathan Marcus Adler, 1845–1890
Hermann Adler, 1891–1911
Joseph Hertz, 1913–1946

Cantors

Myer Lyon was hazzan at the Synagogue from 1767. For some time he also doubled as an opera singer at Covent Garden Theatre under the name 'Michael Leoni'. His rendering of prayers attracted many gentile visitors to the synagogue; amongst them was the Methodist minister Thomas Olivers, who adapted Leoni's rendition of the prayer Yigdal to create the English hymn, The God of Abram Praise; its melody still bears the title Leoni in Hymns Ancient and Modern.

From his arrival in England until his death in 1880 the Anglo-Jewish composer of synagogue music Julius Mombach was associated with the Great Synagogue.  He arrived in 1827 as meshorrer (choirboy) and eventually became the Synagogue's choir master.

In art
In 1819 an aquatint of the interior was drawn by Augustus Charles Pugin and Thomas Rowlandson, and originally published in the popular illustrated magazine of the period, Ackermann's Repository of Arts.   Pugin drew a handsome representation of the Ionic columns supporting the balconies and the classical decoration of the building.  Rowlandson drew caricatures of the congregants, with the hunched shoulders and exaggerated noses traditionally attributed to Jews.

See also
History of the Jews in England
List of demolished buildings and structures in London

References
 Notes

Sources
 Conway, David (2012). Jewry in Music: Entry to the Profession from the Enlightenment to Richard Wagner. Cambridge: Cambridge University Press. 
Kadish, Sharman (1996). Building Jerusalem, Jewish Architecture in Britain, London: Valentine Mitchell
Krinsky, Carol H., Synagogues of Europe; Architecture, History, Meaning, MIT Press, 1985; revised edition, MIT Press, 1986; Dover reprint, 1996

Wischnitzer, Rachel, (1964). The Architecture of the European Synagogue. Jewish Publication Society of America.

External links
The Great Synagogue on Jewish Communities and Records – UK (hosted by jewishgen.org).

Great Synagogue Records on [http://www.synagoguescribes.com/blog/ SynagogueScribes One Stop gateway to Anglo Jewish Records - UK

Ashkenazi Jewish culture in London
Ashkenazi synagogues
Religious buildings and structures completed in 1790
18th-century synagogues
British synagogues bombed by the Luftwaffe
Former synagogues in London
Religion in the City of London
1790 establishments in England
Synagogues destroyed by Nazi Germany